The LG VX8575, often referred to simply as the LG Chocolate Touch, is the fourth cellular phone in the popular LG Chocolate line with the Verizon Wireless network. Like the other Chocolate phones, the phone has an MP3 player that runs on Dolby Mobile. Since its release in November 2009, roughly 1.2 million devices have been sold. The LG Chocolate Touch has a 3.2-megapixel camera. The device was also released on Alltel as the AX8575 or the LG Touch, as well as on U.S. Cellular as the UX8575 or LG Touch. The phone was discontinued in the fall of 2010.

External links
LG Chocolate Touch Official Page

Chocolate